The kings or judges (iudices or judikes) of Logudoro (or Torres) were the local rulers of the locum de Torres or region (province) around Porto Torres, the chief northern port of Sardinia, during the Middle Ages. 
The identity, number, relationships, and chronology of the kings up until about 1112 are poorly sourced and highly disputed among historians of the period.
Gonario I (c. 1015 – c. 1038)
Comita II (c. 1038 – c. 1060)
Barisone I (c. 1060 – c. 1073)
Andrew Tanca (c. 1064 – c. 1073)
Marianus I (to c. 1082)
Constantine I (c. 1082 – c. 1127)
Gonario II (c. 1127 – 1153)
Saltaro (1127), pretender
Ittocorre Gambella (1127 – 1140), regent
Barisone II (1153 – 1186)
Constantine II (1186 – 1198)
Comita III (1198 – 1218)
Marianus II (1218 – 1233)
Barisone III (1233 – 1236)
Adelasia (1236 – 1259)
Ubaldo (1236 – 1238), husband
Enzio (1238 – 1272), husband
Partitioned between Arborea and the Doria.

References